Viviana Marina González Locicero (born 22 April 1958) is an Argentine former professional tennis player. She is also known by her married name Viviana Segal.

Biography
A right-handed player from Rosario, González is the granddaughter of Felipe Locicero, who was a coach of Guillermo Vilas.

González was Argentina's top ranked female player in the late 1970s and represented her country in a total of eight Federation Cup ties.

She was runner-up at the 1978 U.S. Clay Court Championships, with her run including a win over number one seed Mima Jaušovec.

Her best grand slam performance came at the 1978 French Open, where she upset fourth seed Nancy Richey en route to the round of 16 and was a doubles quarter-finalist, partnering Ivanna Madruga.

WTA Tour finals

Singles (0-1)

See also
 List of Argentina Fed Cup team representatives

Notes

References

External links
 
  
 

1958 births
Living people
Argentine female tennis players
Sportspeople from Rosario, Santa Fe
Tennis players at the 1983 Pan American Games
Pan American Games competitors for Argentina